Renschia is a genus of flowering plant in the family Lamiaceae, first described as a genus in 1888. It contains only one known species, Renschia heterotypica, endemic to Somaliland in East Africa.

References

Lamiaceae
Flora of Somalia
Monotypic Lamiaceae genera
Somali montane xeric woodlands